Alticorpus profundicola is a species of haplochromine cichlid which is endemic to Lake Malawi.

References

profundicola
Fish of Lake Malawi
Cichlid fish of Africa
Taxa named by Jay Richard Stauffer Jr.
Taxa named by Kenneth Robert McKaye
Fish described in 1988
Taxonomy articles created by Polbot